"Whiskey on a Sunday" is a song written by Glyn Hughes (1932–1972), which became popular during the second British folk revival. It is sometimes called "The Ballad of Seth Davy".

The song laments the death in 1902 of a performer, Seth Davy, who sang and performed with a set of "dancing dolls" outside a public house in Liverpool. The dolls were attached to the end of a plank, and when the plank was struck and vibrated, this caused the dolls to "dance". Seth Davy was in fact a Jamaican who performed outside the Bevington Bush Hotel around the turn of the century. It was located just north of Liverpool City Centre.

The original song contains lyrics and idiom specific to Liverpool.  In an Irish version, the first-line mention of Bevington Bush appears as Beggars Bush, referring to a location in Dublin. Other versions refer erroneously to Bebington, which is a township in Wirral, on the other side of the River Mersey.

Recordings
The Irish folk singer Danny Doyle covered the song in 1968 and it remained at No. 1 in the Irish charts for ten weeks. The same year, The Irish Rovers recording of the song climbed the Billboard charts in the US where it remained for eight weeks, and #34 in Canada.

It has also been recorded by Irish folk group The Dubliners, Rolf Harris, The Weavers and Max Boyce, among others.

References

British folk songs
Songs about Liverpool
Songs about alcohol